Hassan Babak (born 28 September 1960) is an Iranian wrestler. He competed in the men's Greco-Roman 90 kg at the 1992 Summer Olympics.

References

1960 births
Living people
Iranian male sport wrestlers
Olympic wrestlers of Iran
Wrestlers at the 1992 Summer Olympics
Sportspeople from Tehran
Asian Games silver medalists for Iran
Asian Games medalists in wrestling
Wrestlers at the 1986 Asian Games
Wrestlers at the 1990 Asian Games
Wrestlers at the 1994 Asian Games
Medalists at the 1994 Asian Games
Asian Wrestling Championships medalists
20th-century Iranian people
21st-century Iranian people